Vinchina is a department of the province of La Rioja (Argentina).

Settlements 
 Bajo Jagüé
 Jagüé
 La Banda
 Villa San José de Vinchina

References 

Departments of La Rioja Province, Argentina